Eordea is a monotypic genus of Southeast Asian dwarf spiders containing the single species, Eordea bicolor. It was first described by Eugène Louis Simon in 1899, and has only been found in Indonesia.

See also
 List of Linyphiidae species (A–H)

References

Linyphiidae
Monotypic Araneomorphae genera
Spiders of Asia